Thomas Earp (1828–1893) was a British sculptor and architectural carver who was active in the late 19th century. His best known work is his 1863 reproduction of the Eleanor Cross which stands at Charing Cross in London. He specialised in sculpture for Gothic Revival churches and worked closely with the architect George Edmund Street in the 1860s and 1870s.

Early life and career
Earp was born in Nottingham, England. He studied at the Nottingham School of Art and Design and after completing his studies in the early 1850s went to work for the building contractor George Myers (who himself worked extensively for Pugin) in London.

Around 1851 Earp founded his own architectural sculpture practice. By 1864 he was established at 1 Kennington Road, Lambeth, and employed 24 people.  One of his projects, a marble and alabaster reredos, pulpit and baptismal font for the Church of St John the Baptist, Huntley, was particularly acclaimed and was exhibited at the Great Exhibition of 1862.

Earp and Hobbs Ltd
Earp's practice expanded in 1864 when he went into partnership with another sculptor, Edwin Hobbs Senior (c.1841-1904). Together they opened premises in Chorlton-upon-Medlock, Manchester on Lower Mosley Street, later moving to premises in Moss Side. While Hobbs was based in Manchester, Earp worked from the London office at 32 Canterbury Place, Lambeth Walk. In the late 1880s the business was renamed Earp, Son and Hobbs, and by 1900 it was trading as Earp and Hobbs Ltd. Thomas Earp's son, Edgar Earp worked in the practice along with Edwin Hobbs Junior.

Works

Works include:
 Carving at Shadwell Court, Brettenham, Norfolk for Samuel Sanders Teulon (1865-60) Although Historic England records Teulon's carver as "unknown", Mark Girouard suggests Earp, and is followed in this by Pevsner. 
carved pulpit, Church of St James the Less, Pimlico, London (1862) 
reredos at St Mary Magdalene, Paddington 
reredos at St Peter, Kirkgate, Leeds
Horton family mausoleum, All Saints' churchyard, Middleton Cheney, Northamptonshire (William Wilkinson, 1866–67)
architectural detail, St. James's Church, Milnrow, Lancashire (GE Street, 1868–69)
City Police Courts, Manchester, (Thomas Worthington, 1867–73);
Annunciation group, Cathedral Church of St Marie, Sheffield (1879)
reredos,Cathedral Church of St Andrew, Sydney (1886)
the baptismal font in Rochester Cathedral (1893)
the baptismal font in St Mary's Church, Portsea (1889)
Reredos, St James's Episcopal Church, Leith (1862–65)
the Eleanor Cross, Charing Cross, London (1863)
Reredos in the Lady Chapel, St Margaret's Convent of the Ursulines of Jesus, The Grange, Edinburgh (1877)
architectural detail, St Silas's Church, Glasgow (John Honeyman, 1864)
Crucifixion Scene above the altar, Church of St Thomas à Becket in South Cadbury (1870)
St John the Divine, Kennington, London
Holy Trinity Church, Hastings
St Leonard's Church, Bridgnorth
St Jude's Church, Kensington, London
pulpit, St Michael and All Angels Church, Hughenden, Buckinghamshire
pulpit, Christ Church Cathedral, Dublin

References

External links

1828 births
1893 deaths
19th-century British sculptors
Artists from Nottingham
British architectural sculptors
English sculptors
English male sculptors
Monumental masons